Andrey Shevchuk (born 8 March 1970) is a retired Russian javelin thrower. Her personal best throw was 85.70 metres, achieved in June 1993 in Bratislava.

He won the bronze medal at the 1989 European Junior Championships, finished eighth at the 1992 Olympic Games and won the gold medal at the 1994 Goodwill Games. He competed at the 1994 European Championships without reaching the final.

International competitions

References

1970 births
Living people
Russian male javelin throwers
Soviet male javelin throwers
Olympic athletes of the Unified Team
Athletes (track and field) at the 1992 Summer Olympics
Goodwill Games medalists in athletics
Competitors at the 1994 Goodwill Games